IROC XXX was the 30th and final season of the Crown Royal International Race of Champions, which began on Friday, February 17, 2006 at Daytona International Speedway. The all-star roster included thirteen drivers (in twelve cars) from seven premier racing series. Tony Stewart consistently ran up front and won two races to win the championship, ahead of the equally consistent Matt Kenseth by 12 points. As with the past two seasons, the drivers used their car colors and numbers from their native series (when feasible). This was also the first IROC season since 1991 to include a road course race (held on the Daytona International Speedway road course).

The roster of drivers and final points standings were as follows:

Drivers

Results

Race One (Daytona International Speedway oval)
17- Matt Kenseth
06- Sam Hornish Jr.
46- Frank Kimmel
16- Max Papis
8- Martin Truex Jr.
10- Wayne Taylor
11- Steve Kinser
20- Tony Stewart
08- Scott Sharp
1- Ted Musgrave
12- Ryan Newman
6- Mark Martin

Race Two (Texas Motor Speedway)
20- Tony Stewart
12- Ryan Newman
8- Martin Truex Jr.
6- Mark Martin
17- Matt Kenseth
10- Max Angelelli
08- Scott Sharp
46- Frank Kimmel
1- Ted Musgrave
16- Max Papis
11- Steve Kinser
06- Sam Hornish Jr.

Race Three (Daytona International Speedway road course)
20- Tony Stewart
16- Max Papis
12- Ryan Newman
08- Scott Sharp
06- Sam Hornish Jr.
8- Martin Truex Jr.
10- Max Angelelli
46- Frank Kimmel
6- Mark Martin
17-Matt Kenseth
11- Steve Kinser
1- Ted Musgrave

Race Four (Atlanta Motor Speedway)
8- Martin Truex Jr.
17- Matt Kenseth
20- Tony Stewart
12- Ryan Newman
1- Ted Musgrave
6- Mark Martin
46- Frank Kimmel
16- Max Papis
06- Sam Hornish Jr.
11- Steve Kinser
10- Wayne Taylor
08- Scott Sharp

Standings

References

International Race of Champions
2006 in American motorsport